A matchbox is a box made of cardboard or thin wood designed to hold matches. 

Matchbox may also refer to:

Music
 "Matchbox" (song), a 1957 rock and roll song written and recorded by Carl Perkins
 "Matchbox Blues", a 1927 blues song by Blind Lemon Jefferson
 "Matchbox", song by English Indie band The Kooks from their first album, Inside In / Inside Out
 Matchbox (band), English pop/rockabilly group, popular in the early 1980s
 Matchbox Twenty, American rock band

Film
 Matchbox (2002 film), Greek film
 Matchbox (2017 film), Malayalam film

Other
 Matchbox (brand), well-known brand name of die-cast toys, originally sold in replica matchbox packaging
 Matchbox (window manager), window manager designed for embedded platforms
 Matchboxing or gutterboxing, the practice of displaying video with a distinct border around the edges of the screen
 Matchbox sign, psychiatric symptom seen in delusional parasitosis and Morgellons
 Matchbox (drinking game), game played using a matchbox

See also 
 Matchbook (disambiguation)